Bryant is a city in Saline County, Arkansas, United States and a suburb of Little Rock. According to the 2010 Census, the population of the city was 16,688. It is part of the Central Arkansas region.

History
European settlers established themselves along Hurricane Creek in the early 19th century. A skirmish in the area occurred during the American Civil War. Rail service in the 1870s brought development. The town was hard hit by economic struggles in the early 20th century and through the Great Depression. World War II era saw development as demand for the area's bauxite grew.

Geography
Bryant is located at  (34.613518, -92.491464).

Demographics

2020 census

As of the 2020 United States census, there were 20,663 people, 8,203 households, and 5,260 families residing in the city.

2000 census
As of the census of 2000, there were 9,764 people, 3,601 households, and 2,823 families residing in the city. The racial makeup of the city was 95.2% White, 1.5% Black or African American, 0.34% Native American, 1.05% Asian, 0.37% from other races, and 0.84% from two or more races. 1.05% of the population were Hispanic or Latino of any race.

There were 3,601 households, out of which 42.6% had children under the age of 18 living with them, 63.9% were married couples living together, 11.1% had a female householder with no husband present, and 21.6% were non-families. 19.1% of all households were made up of individuals, and 7.0% had someone living alone who was 65 years of age or older. The average household size was 2.65 and the average family size was 3.03.

In the city, the population was spread out, with 27.9% under the age of 18, 7.1% from 18 to 24, 32.7% from 25 to 44, 21.8% from 45 to 64, and 10.4% who were 65 years of age or older. The median age was 35 years. For every 100 females, there were 89.8 males. For every 100 females age 18 and over, there were 86.5 males.

The median income for a household in the city was $48,870, and the median income for a family was $56,038. Males had a median income of $39,380 versus $26,261 for females. The per capita income for the city was $20,730. About 3.5% of families and 4.8% of the population were below the poverty line, including 6.1% of those under age 18 and 8.0% of those age 65 or over.

Water supply
Bryant purchases treated surface water from Lake Maumelle and Lake Winona from Central Arkansas Water.

Government and infrastructure
The Arkansas Department of Human Services Arkansas Juvenile Assessment & Treatment Center (AJATC) is located in Bryant.

The U.S. Postal Service operates the Bryant Post Office.

Education
Public education for elementary and secondary school students is provided by the Bryant School District, with students graduating from Bryant High School.

Notable people
 Karen Aston - women's basketball head coach, University of Texas
 Sean Michel - Musician
 Natalie White - winner of reality TV show Survivor: Samoa
 Travis Wood - Major League Baseball pitcher

References

External links

 Bryant, Arkansas Official Site
 Bryant Public Schools Official Site

Cities in Arkansas
Cities in Saline County, Arkansas
Cities in Little Rock–North Little Rock–Conway metropolitan area